Royston Isaac Romain (27 July 1918 – 19 December 2010) was a British swimmer who competed in the Olympic games in 1948 in London.

Biography
He was educated at Forest School, Walthamstow. He competed in the 1948 Summer Olympics in men's 200 metres breaststroke, but did not win a medal, despite having gone into the competition with the year's fastest time. He also represented England and won a gold medal in the 330 yard medley relay and a silver medal in the 220 yard breaststroke at the 1950 British Empire Games in Auckland, New Zealand. At the ASA National British Championships he won the 220 yards breaststroke title in 1947, 1948 and 1949. He began swimming at the age of nine or ten and continued into his 90s, winning the world Masters Swimming competitions in his 70s and 80s.

See also
 List of Commonwealth Games medallists in swimming (men)

References

External links
 

1918 births
2010 deaths
English male swimmers
Olympic swimmers of Great Britain
Swimmers at the 1948 Summer Olympics
European Aquatics Championships medalists in swimming
Swimmers at the 1950 British Empire Games
Commonwealth Games gold medallists for England
Commonwealth Games silver medallists for England
Commonwealth Games medallists in swimming
Medallists at the 1950 British Empire Games